Now Do You Get It Why I'm Crying? (Begrijpt U Nu Waarom Ik Huil?) is a 1969 documentary film by Dutch director Louis van Gasteren.

In the late 1960s Van Gasteren was drawn to the work of the Leiden University professor Jan Bastiaans treating traumatized war survivors. Gasteren was concerned about the psychotherapeutic treatment with LSD on a former concentration camp prisoner in Bastiaans' clinic. The patient focused on was named Joop. Joop was arrested by the Nazis in September 1941 and underwent a long journey through hell among different camps until he was liberated by the Russians in 1945. Joop returned home to his wife a different man. He had nightmares and was incapable of ordinary human contact. With two cameras Gasteren shot about six and a half hours of the first treatment Joop underwent at Bastiaans. Particular attention is paid to details: Joop's hands, the sweat on his forehead, a tear running down his cheek slowly. From this Gasteren edited more than one hour of film that made a big impression at release and even led to questions in Parliament. 16 mm, b/w, 62 minutes.

In 2003 Van Gasteren directed a sequel, The Price of Survival, about Joop's surviving family and their own continued suffering after his death in 2000. 62 min, 35mm.

References

External links
 Now Do You Get It - 1969 at YouTube.
 The Bastiaans Method of Drug-Assisted Therapy

1969 films
Films directed by Louis van Gasteren
Dutch documentary films
Documentary films about World War II
Documentary films about mental health